The Nikkei 225, or , more commonly called the Nikkei or the Nikkei index, is a stock market index for the Tokyo Stock Exchange (TSE).  It has been calculated daily by the Nihon Keizai Shimbun (The Nikkei) newspaper since 1950.  It is a price-weighted index, operating in the Japanese Yen (JP¥), and its components are reviewed once a year. The Nikkei measures the performance of 225 large, publicly owned companies in Japan from a wide array of industry sectors.

Another major index for the Tokyo Stock Exchange is the Tokyo Stock Price Index (TOPIX).

History
Since January 2010, the index is updated every 15 seconds during trading sessions.

The Nikkei 225 Futures, introduced at Singapore Exchange (SGX) in 1986, the Osaka Securities Exchange (OSE) in 1988, Chicago Mercantile Exchange (CME) in 1990, is now an internationally recognized futures index.

The Nikkei average has deviated sharply from the textbook model of stock averages, which grow at a steady exponential rate.  The average hit its all-time high on 29 December 1989, during the peak of the Japanese asset price bubble, when it reached an intra-day high of 38,957.44, before closing at 38,915.87, having grown sixfold during the decade.  Subsequently, it lost nearly all these gains, closing at 7,054.98 on  March 10, 2009 — 81.9% below its peak nearly twenty years earlier.

On  March 15 2011, the second working day after the massive earthquake in the northeast part of Japan, the index dropped over 10% to finish at 8605.15, a loss of 1,015 points.  The index continued to drop throughout 2011, bottoming out at 8160.01 on  November 25, putting it at its lowest close since  March 31st, 2009.  The Nikkei fell over 17% in 2011, finishing the year at 8455.35, its lowest year-end closing value in nearly thirty years, when the index finished at 8016.70 in 1982.

The Nikkei started 2013 near 10,600, hitting a peak of 15,942 in May.  However, shortly afterward, it plunged by almost 10% before rebounding, making it the most volatile stock market index among the developed markets.  By 2015, it has reached over 20,000 mark; marking a gain of over 10,000 in two years, making it one of the fastest growing stock market indexes in the world.  However, by 2018, the index growth has been more moderate at around the 22,000 mark.

There is concern that the rise since 2013 is artificial and due to purchases by the Bank of Japan ("BOJ").  From a start in 2013, by end 2017, The BOJ owned circa 75% of all Japanese Exchange Traded Funds ("ETFs"), and are a top 10 shareholder of 90% of the Nikkei 225 constituents.

On February 15, 2021, the Nikkei average breached the 30,000 benchmark, its highest level in 30 years, due to the levels of monetary stimulus and asset purchase programs executed by the Bank of Japan to mitigate the financial effects of the COVID-19 pandemic.

Weighting
The index is a price-weighted index.  As of early 2022, the company with the largest influence on the index is Fast Retailing.

Contract Specifications 
The Nikkei 225 is traded as a future on the Osaka exchange. The contract specifications for the Nikkei 225 (ticker symbol JNK) are listed below:

Annual returns
The following table shows the annual development of the Nikkei 225, which was calculated back to 1914.

Components
As of October 2021, the Nikkei 225 consists of the following companies: (Japanese securities identification code in parentheses)

Fishery
Nissui Corporation
Maruha Nichiro Holdings, Inc.

Mining
Inpex Corp.

Construction
Comsys Holdings Corp.
Daiwa House Industry Co., Ltd.
Haseko Corp.
JGC Corporation
Kajima Corp.
Obayashi Corp.
Sekisui House, Ltd.
Shimizu Corp.
Taisei Corp.

Foods
Ajinomoto Co., Inc.
Asahi Group Holdings, Ltd.
Japan Tobacco Inc.
Kikkoman Corp.
Kirin Holdings Company, Limited
Meiji Holdings Company, Limited
Nichirei Corp.
NH Foods, Ltd.
Nisshin Seifun Group Inc.
Sapporo Holdings Ltd.
Takara Holdings Inc.

Textiles & apparel
Teijin Ltd.
Toray Industries, Inc.
Toyobo Co., Ltd.
Unitika, Ltd.

Pulp & paper
Nippon Paper Industries Co., Ltd.
Oji Holdings Corporation

Chemicals
Asahi Kasei Corp.
Denki Kagaku Kogyo K.K.
DIC Corporation
Fujifilm Holdings Corp.
Kao Corp.
Kuraray Co., Ltd.
Mitsubishi Chemical Holdings Corp.
Mitsui Chemicals, Inc.
Nissan Chemical Industries, Ltd.
Nitto Denko
Shin-Etsu Chemical Co., Ltd.
Shiseido Co., Ltd.
Showa Denko K.K.
Sumitomo Chemical Co., Ltd.
Tokuyama Corporation
Tosoh Corp.
Ube Industries, Ltd.

Pharmaceuticals
Astellas Pharma Inc.
Chugai Pharmaceutical Co., Ltd.
Daiichi Sankyo Company, Limited
Sumitomo Dainippon Pharma Co., Ltd.
Eisai Co., Ltd.
Kyowa Hakko Kirin Co., Ltd.
Otsuka Holdings Co., Ltd.
Shionogi & Co., Ltd.
Takeda Pharmaceutical Company Limited

Petroleum
Eneos Holdings
Idemitsu Kosan Co., Ltd

Rubber
Bridgestone Corp.
The Yokohama Rubber Co., Ltd.

Glass & Ceramics
AGC Inc.
NGK Insulators, Ltd.
Nippon Electric Glass Co., Ltd.
Nippon Sheet Glass Co., Ltd.
Sumitomo Osaka Cement Co., Ltd.
Taiheiyo Cement Corp.
Tokai Carbon Co., Ltd.
Toto Ltd.

Steel
JFE Holdings, Inc.
Kobe Steel, Ltd.
Nippon Steel Corp.
Pacific Metals Co., Ltd.

Nonferrous metals
Dowa Holdings Co., Ltd.
Fujikura Ltd.
The Furukawa Electric Co., Ltd.
Mitsubishi Materials Corp.
Mitsui Mining & Smelting Co., Ltd.
Nippon Light Metal Co., Ltd
SUMCO Corp.
Sumitomo Electric Industries, Ltd.
Sumitomo Metal Mining Co., Ltd.
Toho Zinc Co., Ltd.

Machinery
Amada Co. Ltd. 
Daikin Industries, Ltd.
Ebara Corp.
Hitachi Construction Machinery Co., Ltd.
Hitachi Zōsen Corporation
IHI Corp.
The Japan Steel Works, Ltd.
JTEKT Corp.
Komatsu Ltd.
Kubota Corp.
Mitsubishi Heavy Industries, Ltd.
NSK Ltd.
NTN Corp.
Okuma Holdings, Inc.
Sumitomo Heavy Industries, Ltd.

Electric machinery
Advantest Corp.
Alps Electric Co., Ltd.
Canon Inc.
Casio Computer Co., Ltd.
Dainippon Screen Mfg. Co., Ltd.
Denso Corp.
FANUC Corp.
Fuji Electric Co., Ltd.
Fujitsu Ltd.
GS Yuasa Corp.
Hitachi, Ltd.
Keyence Corp.
Kyocera Corp.
MinebeaMitsumi, Inc.
Mitsubishi Electric Corp.
Murata Manufacturing Co., Ltd.
NEC Corp.
Oki Electric Industry Co., Ltd.
Omron Corp.
Panasonic Corp.
Ricoh Co., Ltd.
Seiko Epson Corp.
Sharp Corp.
Sony Corp.
Taiyo Yuden Co., Ltd.
TDK Corp.
Tokyo Electron Ltd.
Yaskawa Electric Corporation, Limited
Yokogawa Electric Corp.

Shipbuilding
Kawasaki Heavy Industries, Ltd.
Mitsui Engineering & Shipbuilding Co., Ltd.

Automotive
Hino Motors, Ltd.
Honda Motor Co., Ltd.
Isuzu Motors Ltd.
Mazda Motor Corp.
Mitsubishi Motors Corp.
Nissan Motor Co., Ltd.
Subaru Corp.
Suzuki Motor Corp.
Toyota Motor Corp.
Yamaha Motor Company, Ltd.

Precision instruments
Citizen Watch Co., Ltd.
Konica Minolta Holdings, Inc.
Nikon Corp.
Olympus Corp.
Terumo Corp.

Trading companies
Itochu Corp.
Marubeni Corp.
Mitsubishi Corp.
Mitsui & Co., Ltd.
Sojitz Corp.
Sumitomo Corp.
Toyota Tsusho Corp.

Other manufacturing
Bandai Namco Holdings, Inc.
Dai Nippon Printing Co., Ltd.
Toppan Printing Co., Ltd.
Yamaha Corp.

Retail
Aeon Co., Ltd.
Fast Retailing Co., Ltd.
Isetan Mitsukoshi Holdings Ltd.
J. Front Retailing Co., Ltd.
Marui Group Co., Ltd.
Seven & I Holdings Co., Ltd.
Takashimaya Co., Ltd.

Banking
Aozora Bank, Ltd.
The Chiba Bank, Ltd.
Concordia Financial Group, Inc.
Sumitomo Mitsui Trust Holdings, Inc.
Fukuoka Financial Group, Inc.
Mitsubishi UFJ Financial Group, Inc.
Mizuho Financial Group, Inc.
Resona Holdings, Inc.
Shinsei Bank, Ltd.
The Shizuoka Bank, Ltd.
Sumitomo Mitsui Financial Group, Inc.

Securities
Daiwa Securities Group Inc.
Matsui Securities Co., Ltd.
Nomura Holdings, Inc.

Insurance
Dai-ichi Life Insurance Company, Limited
MS&AD Insurance Group, Inc.
Sompo Holdings, Inc.
T&D Holdings, Inc.
Tokio Marine Holdings, Inc.

Other financial services
Credit Saison Co., Ltd.
Japan Exchange Group Inc.

Real estate
Mitsubishi Estate Co., Ltd.
Mitsui Fudosan Co.,Ltd
Sumitomo Realty & Development Co., Ltd.
Tokyo Tatemono Co., Ltd.
Tokyu Land Corp.

Railway/bus
Central Japan Railway Company
East Japan Railway Company
Keio Corp.
Keisei Electric Railway Co., Ltd.
Odakyu Electric Railway Co., Ltd.
Tobu Railway Co., Ltd.
Tokyu Corp.
West Japan Railway Company

Land transport
Nippon Express Co., Ltd.
Yamato Holdings Co., Ltd.

Marine transport
Kawasaki Kisen Kaisha, Ltd.
Mitsui O.S.K. Lines, Ltd.
Nippon Yusen K.K.

Air transport
ANA Holdings Inc.

Warehousing
Mitsubishi Logistics Corp.

Communications
KDDI Corp.
Nippon Telegraph & Telephone Corp.
NTT Data Corp.
SoftBank Corp.
SoftBank Group Corp.

Electric power
Chubu Electric Power Co., Inc.
The Kansai Electric Power Co., Inc.
Tokyo Electric Power Company Holdings, Incorporated

Gas
Osaka Gas Co., Ltd.
Tokyo Gas Co., Ltd.

Services
Cyberagent Inc.
Dena Co., Ltd.
Dentsu Inc.
Japan Post Holdings Co., Ltd.
Konami Corp.
M3 Inc.
Nexon Co., Ltd.
Nintendo Co., Ltd.
Rakuten Inc.
Recruit Holdings Co., Ltd.
Secom Co., Ltd.
Toho Co., Ltd.
Trend Micro Inc.
Z Holdings Corp.

See also

S&P/TOPIX 150

References

External links
Nikkei 225 Components — official website at indexes.Nikkei.co.jp
Index detail: Nikkei Stock Average 225 — at Reuters
Nikkei 225 page – NKY:IND — on Bloomberg Markets
Nikkei 225 index — on Google Finance
Nikkei 225 index — on Yahoo! Finance
Nikkei 225 index — on Hargreaves Lansdown
Nikkei 225 profile — at Wikinvest

1950 establishments in Japan
Nikkei Inc.
Japanese stock market indices
Tokyo Stock Exchange